The International Marxist Tendency (IMT) is an international Marxist political tendency. It was founded by Trotskyist political theorist Ted Grant and his supporters following their break with the Committee for a Workers' International in 1992. The organization's website, Marxist.com or In Defence of Marxism, is edited by Alan Woods. The site is multilingual, and publishes international current affairs articles written from a Marxist perspective, as well as many historical and theoretical articles. The IMT is active in over 40 countries worldwide.

History

Militant (also known as the Militant tendency) was an entryist group within the British Labour Party based around the Militant newspaper which was founded in 1964. In 1974, Militant and its allies in Sweden, Ireland and other countries formed the Committee for a Workers' International.  The organisation gained more members during the 1970s and early 1980s and dominated the Labour Party in Liverpool. It became the largest Trotskyist group in Europe. In 1983, the five members of the Militant newspaper's editorial board were expelled for contravening the Labour Party constitution and expulsions of Militant members continued throughout the rest of the decade.

Ted Grant was a long time leader of Militant until it split in early 1992 over a number of issues, primarily whether to continue working within the Labour Party. The majority, rejecting entryism, formed Militant Labour, which subsequently became the Socialist Party of England and Wales. Grant argued that leaving Labour would amount to throwing away many decades of patient work and maintained that Marxists should remain within the party. However, he and his supporters were expelled from the tendency and together with Alan Woods they formed Socialist Appeal in Britain.

The factional fight within Militant that led to the expulsion of Grant and Woods also played itself out within the CWI, with supporters of the Grant faction leaving to form the Committee for a Marxist International in several countries, particularly Spain.

At its World Congress in 2006, the organisation was renamed the International Marxist Tendency (IMT).

Woods is editor of the British section's journal Socialist Appeal and of the IMT website, In Defence of Marxism.

Theory and tactics

The International Marxist Tendency adheres to Orthodox Trotskyism, emphasising the education of cadres of workers and youth. In particular, the organization claims the scientific socialism of Karl Marx as the fundamental basis of its political and philosophical theory. It adds other authors to its theoretical corpus, mainly Lenin and Trotsky, but also Friedrich Engels and Rosa Luxemburg.

The IMT is a revolutionary international organization whose objective is the overthrow of the capitalist system and the establishment of a socialist society, without social classes and without State, where production would be managed collectively by, and for, the benefit of all. However, the organization's position is that in this process, there will necessarily exist a transitional workers' state which the working class will democratically control: "While the capitalists need a state to maintain class rule, the workers need one precisely to end it."

Just as the Committee for a Worker's International pursued a policy of entryism within traditional mass social democratic parties up until the early 1990s, IMT groups across the world pursue this method in their respective Labour Parties (where they exist). The organization considers that it is necessary to spread the ideas of Marxism within preexisting political organizations because it allows to reach the most militant elements of the working class. Its general stance is that to cut itself off from these organizations is a sectarian attitude which confines the Marxist ideas to the margins of the movement. Therefore, in general, the militants of the IMT will attempt to carry on their political work within communist or social-democratic parties.

This main strategy is applied in a flexible way depending on the context. Rather than a rigid doctrine, it is a general line to be used as a guide for action. For example, the French section of the IMT (Révolution) works within La France Insoumise, the British section (Socialist Appeal) used to work as a collective within the Labour Party, and the American section (Socialist Revolution) does not pursue entryism, instead supporting a campaign for a trade union-backed Labour Party.

This activity is typically combined with independent work outside these parties, such as organizing public conferences or Marxist literature booths, and always with a strong observance of not liquidating the organisation within the activism.

National sections
The IMT has sections in many countries worldwide, including Esquerda Marxista in Brazil, Sinistra classe rivoluzione in Italy, Revolutie (previously Vonk) in the Netherlands, Socialist Fightback in Canada, and Socialist Appeal in Britain.

Its section in France, Révolution (formerly La Riposte), practiced entryism in the French Communist Party. In 2008, La Riposte supported an alternative platform at the PCF party conference which received the support of 15% of voters, following which Révolution left the French Communist Party and became a member of La France Insoumise while La Riposte stayed within the PCF and are no longer a section of the International Marxist Tendency.

The IMT's Brazilian section, Esquerda Marxista (Marxist Left) was formerly a recognized tendency within the ruling Workers' Party and has a majority in the Movimento Negro Socialista (Socialist Black Movement, MNS). On May 5th 2015, the Brazilian section announced its withdrawal from the Workers' Party, citing the failure of this party to stand up to austerity and its support for police repression of protest movements.

Two members of the Greek section, Κομμουνιστική Τάση (Communist Tendency), were elected to the Central Committee of SYRIZA during its founding congress in July 2013. This faction has since pushed within SYRIZA for the rejection of austerity, and for the party to carry out socialist policies. This organization's positions have gained the attention of the Wall Street Journal, which interviewed some members as part of an article on June 23rd 2015. The Communist Tendency joined the newly founded Popular Unity following its split from SYRIZA. In the summer of 2016, Communist Tendency split from Popular Unity after the latter’s founding conference.

The Mexican section, La Izquierda Socialista, has been active in the National Regeneration Movement. Several members of the Mexican section were mentioned by name in articles by the Conservative newspaper La Razón. These articles took note of these members large role in student struggles at Instituto Politécnico Nacional, and accused them of being outside agitators linked to the left-wing writer and politician Paco Ignacio Taibo II. On August 26th 2015 members of La Izquerda Socialista were injured in a confrontation with riot police after leaving an "Ayotzinapa" protest in Mexico city. Among the injured was Ubaldo Meneses, editor of the organization's newspaper, and a member of the national council of MORENA.

In preparation for the Italian general election in 2018, the IMT's Italian section, Sinistra Classe Rivoluzione (Left, Class, Revolution), launched the For a Revolutionary Left electoral alliance with the Workers' Communist Party, the Italian section of the Coordinating Committee for the Refoundation of the Fourth International (CRFI). The alliance received 0.08% of the vote.

Since the rapid growth of the Democratic Socialists of America since the 2016 presidential election in the United States, US members of the IMT have joined DSA chapters around the country.

At its XIII Congress on 3–4 May 2019, the Revolutionary Workers' Party voted to fuse with the Russian section of the International Marxist Tendency and for the united party to affiliate to the IMT. In 2019, the Russian IMT section led the anti-clerical campaign in Moscow and successfully supported the election campaign of one of the Communist Party candidates for the Moscow City Duma (city council). In the municipal elections in Moscow in 2022, an activist of the Marxist tendency, Boris Izrailev, was elected to the council of the Zyuzino district, becoming the only representative of the opposition in it, as well as the first Trotskyist elected to representative bodies in the post-Soviet history of Russia.

Sections of the IMT

International Activity

The IMT has spread to parts of Latin America, where it now has groups in Venezuela, Peru, Argentina, Mexico, Bolivia, Brazil, and El Salvador. At the end of 2002 it promoted the launching of the solidarity campaign Hands Off Venezuela, which is now active in 30 countries and has had resolutions passed within the trade union movements in Britain, Canada, Italy, and other countries. IMT activists also play an important role in the FRETECO (Front of Factories Under Workers' Control) movement in Brazil and Venezuela. They have been especially active in Venezuela, where their section used to support Hugo Chávez while promoting the ideas of Marx, Lenin, and Trotsky. In 2010, Ramon Muchacho, leader of the main Venezuelan opposition party Primero Justicia, claimed that Alan Woods of the IMT was the "principal ideological adviser and personal friend" of Chávez, a claim played down by Alan Woods.

Once every two years, the IMT organizes its World Congress (WC) the last one having taken place in 2021. It convened online due to the 2019 global COVID-19 pandemic. The last in-person WC was held in 2018 in the Italian Alps and was attended by 370 Marxists from 25 countries. The function of the congress is to discuss the progress of IMT in the world, present reports, and plan future activities. Usually, on years without a WC, the IMT holds an International Marxist University (IMU, formerly World School) which consists in a series of presentations on Marxist theory, the history of the workers' movement, and the perspectives for the world socialist revolution. Again, due to the pandemic, the 2022 IMU was exceptionally held digitally.

In addition to these annual meetings, the IMT regularly organizes international gatherings on a continental or sub continental scale. In 2008, for example, the International organized a winter university in Berlin on the occasion of the 90th anniversary of the death of Rosa Luxemburg and Karl Liebknecht. In 2009, the IMT organized its first Pan-American conference, bringing together Marxist activists from a dozen American countries. The Canadian section (Socialist Fightback/La Riposte socialiste) has held the Montreal Marxist Winter School yearly since 2013.

In 2012, the IMT published an article denouncing the attempted assassination of Malala Yousafzai, claiming she is an IMT sympathizer and showing a picture of her speaking at an IMT school in Swat, Pakistan. Woods's statement has been used to interpret Yousafzai's politics and to speculate on whether she has a communist or anti-religious agenda. Yousafzai sent greetings to the March 9th 2013 congress of the Pakistani section of the IMT, in which she said, "I am convinced Socialism is the only answer and I urge all comrades to take this struggle to a victorious conclusion. Only this will free us from the chains of bigotry and exploitation."

Splits
In late 2009 a dispute developed between the IMT leadership and the leaderships of its sections in Spain (El Militante), Venezuela (Corriente Marxista Revolucionaria) and Mexico. In January 2010, these organisations, together with the group in Colombia and part of the section in Mexico, broke with the IMT and established a new international body, the Izquierda Revolucionaria (Revolutionary Left). Minorities in Venezuela and Spain chose to remain with the IMT and set up new sections. The new IMT Venezuelan section launched their newspaper, Lucha de Clases, in April 2010. 

In 2016, the Corriente Marxista Revolucionaria issued a joint declaration with the Committee for a Workers' International announcing that the organizations are conducting joint work. In the same year, another smaller split occurred. The majority of the Swedish section, factions in Poland and Britain and individuals from several other sections left the IMT to form a new group called Towards a New International Tendency. The Iranian section of the IMT also split away over the international's position on Venezuela's friendly relations with the Iranian government and in 2011 launched Marxist Revival with co-thinkers in Britain. The Pakistani section split, with the majority leaving, while the minority reorganized as "Lal Salaam" (Red Salute).

Publications
In addition to the international website, each national section has its own website in that country's respective language(s). There is also a quantity of audio and video material on the site. The IMT operates a publisher, Wellred Books, which publishes a number of books by Trotsky, Alan Woods, and other authors. The publishing house sells through its online bookstore and supplies IMT sections with material for their book stalls. Every section of the IMT regularly publishes theoretical periodicals, such as In Defence of Marxism, "America Socialista", Asian Marxist Review or "FalceMartello".

The site's name, In Defence of Marxism, is derived from the title given to a collection of letters and articles by Trotsky.

References

External links

 
 U.S. Website
 Publishing (UK)
 Publishing (US)

 
International Socialist Organisations